Charles Frederick Weber Jr. (March 25, 1930 – October 22, 2017) was an American football linebacker in the National Football League. He played seven seasons for the Cleveland Browns (1955–1956), the Chicago Cardinals (1956–1958), and the Philadelphia Eagles (1959–1961). 

After retirement, he worked as defensive coordinator for Cincinnati Bengals and Baltimore Colts, where he succeeded teammate Maxie Baughan.

Biography
Weber grew up in suburban Philadelphia and went to Abington High School. 

He was the defensive coordinator of the Cincinnati Bengals from 1970 through 1974. Weber provided six interceptions for Philadelphia Eagles 1960 championship team. 

Weber resided in San Diego, California and died on October 22, 2017 at the age of eighty-seven.

References 

1930 births
2017 deaths
American football linebackers
Cleveland Browns players
Chicago Cardinals players
Philadelphia Eagles players
Boston Patriots (AFL) coaches
West Chester Golden Rams football players
Sportspeople from Philadelphia
Players of American football from Philadelphia
21st-century American politicians
National Football League defensive coordinators